Mahjong Competition Rules (MCR), also known as Competition Mahjong and Guóbiāo Májiàng (simplified Chinese: 国标麻将, National Standard Mahjong), is an international standard of rules and scoring criteria for mahjong founded by the All-China Sports Federation in July 1998 and supported by some mahjong societies, mostly in Asia. Many tournaments have adopted this standard and some mahjong societies exclusively use this scoring system for all play. It is characterised by dozens of possible combinations and a rather complex and inventive set of patterns. In effect, it mixes the scoring rules of several different mahjong variations. The game play is otherwise quite similar to Old Hong Kong Mahjong.

Main features 

There are exactly 4 hands for each prevalent wind, because the seat wind always changes after each round of 4 hands. Thus one match consists of exactly 16 hands.
Points called "fan" (番) are given according to factors such as the tiles a player has or how complete a player's hand is. Any player can declare a winning hand only if he has 8 or more points with his hand's completion.
The winner of a hand receives points from the other 3 players as follows:
If the winner completes an x-point hand on a self-draw, he receives (8+x) points from each of the other three players.
If the winner completes an x-point hand off a tile discarded by another player, he receives (8+x) points from the player having discarded the tile, and 8 points from each of the other two players.
There are no restrictions on completing a hand using discarded tiles. (Other rules have such restrictions.)
Positions of seats are changed every 4 hands—i.e., at the beginning of each new prevailing wind.
When a "Concealed Kong" (暗槓, àngàng) is obtained, all four tiles are placed face-down in front of the player and are not revealed until the end of the hand.
There is no dead wall.

Scoring principles 
First, determine the primary fan, which is the highest scoring fan. Then add lesser fan according to the following principles:

 The Non-Repeat Principle: When a fan is inevitably implied or included by another fan, both fan may not be scored.
 The Non-Separation Principle ("Unbreakable"): After combining sets to create a fan, it is forbidden to rearrange those same sets to create a different fan.
 The Non-Identical Principle: Once a set has been used to create a fan, it is not allowed to use the same set together with other sets to create the same fan.
 Freedom to Choose the Highest Points ("the High- versus- Low Principle"): If you can use a set to form both a high-score fan and a low-score fan, it is your right to choose the high-score fan.
 The Account-Once Principle ("Exclusionary rule"): When you have combined some sets to create a fan, you can only combine any remaining sets once with a set that has already been used.
 The Exclusionary Rule is considered controversial as it extremely confusing and rarely affects scoring in a meaningful way. Some online Mahjong websites interpret this rule as "each set can only be used twice" which allows a used set to be combined with another used set.

88 points

Big Four Winds 
(Chinese: 大四喜 dà sì xǐ)
A hand with triplets or quads of all four winds.
These points are not counted: "Big Three Winds", "All Pungs", "Seat Wind", "Prevalent Wind" and "Pung of Terminals or Honours".

ex.1) with "All Terminals or Honours" and "Half Flush"

ex.2) with "All Honours"

Big Three Dragons 
(Chinese: 大三元 dà sān yuán)
A hand with triplets or quads of all three dragons.
These points are not counted: "Dragon Pung" and "Two Dragons Pung".

ex.1) with "Outside Hand" and "One Voided Suit"

ex.2) with "All Honours" (and "Seat Wind", "Prevalent Wind" and "Pung of Terminals or Honours" if applicable)

All Green 
(Chinese: 绿一色 lǜ yī sè)
A hand consisting of only green tiles, i.e. .

ex.1) with "Half Flush","Tile Hog", "Dragon Pung"

ex.2) with "Full Flush", "Pure Shifted Pungs", "All Pungs" and "All Simples"

Nine Gates 
(Chinese: 九莲宝灯 jiǔ lián bǎo dēng)
Collecting number tiles 1112345678999 of one suit without melding, and completing with any one tile of that suit. If you collect the form of 1112345678999, any one tile of that suit can complete your hand. (See the figure below.)
These points are not counted: "Full Flush" and "Pung of Terminals or Honours", "No Honours".

ex.1) with "Tile Hog" and "Pure Straight"
hand: 
completion: 

ex.2) with "Two Concealed Pungs" and "Short Straight"
hand: 
completion:

Four Kongs 
(Chinese: 四杠 sì gàng)
A hand with four quad melds (regardless of open or close).
These points are not counted: "Melded Kong", "Concealed Kong", "Two Melded Kongs", "Two Concealed Kongs", "Three Kongs", "All Pungs" and "Single Wait".

ex.1) with "Upper Tiles", "Mixed Shifted Pungs", "Mixed Double Pung" and two "Pung of Terminals or Honours"
meld: 
meld: 
meld: 
meld: 
hand: 

ex.2) with "All Terminals or Honours", "Triple Pung", "All Types" and "Dragon Pung"
meld: 
meld: 
meld: 
meld: 
hand:

Seven Shifted Pairs 
(Chinese: 连七对 lián qī duì)
Seven pairs hand with successive seven numbers in one suit.
These points are not counted: "Seven Pairs", "Full Flush", "Concealed Hand" and "Single Wait".

ex.1) "Seven Shifted Pairs" only

ex.2) with "All Simples"

Thirteen Orphans 
(Chinese: 十三幺 shí sān yāo)
Collecting all thirteen terminal and honor tiles for one, plus one of them.
These points are not counted: "All Types", "Concealed Hand" and "Single Wait".

ex.)

64 points

All Terminals 
(Chinese: 清幺九 qīng yāo jiǔ)
A hand consisting of only terminal tiles, i.e. number 1 or 9 tiles.
These points are not counted: "No Honours", "Pung of Terminals or Honours" and "All Pungs". Can be combined with "Seven Pairs"

ex.1) with two "Mixed Double Pung"

ex.2) with "Seven Pairs" and "Tile Hog"

Little Four Winds 
(Chinese: 小四喜 xiǎo sì xǐ)
A hand with three winds be triplets or quads, and rest of wind be pair.
Point of "Big Three Winds" and "Pung of Terminals or Honours" is not counted.

ex.) with "Half Flush", "All Pungs" (and "Seat Wind", "Prevalent Wind" if applicable)

Little Three Dragons 
(Chinese: 小三元 xiǎo sān yuán)
A hand with two dragons be triplets or quads, and rest of dragon be pair.
These points are not counted: "Two Dragons Pungs" and "Dragon Pung".

ex.) with "All Terminals or Honours", "One Voided Suit" and "Mixed Double Pung"

All Honours 
(Chinese: 全字 quán zì)
A hand consisting of only honour tiles.
These points are not counted: "All Pungs" and "Pung of Terminals or Honours". Can be combined with "Seven Pairs". It is Limit not because of dui dui 2 doubles or the dragons being 2 doubles making 4 doubles. It is because of 3 little winds already being limit. Even if the winds are not your seat wind, it is limit.

ex.1) with "Two Dragon Pungs" (and "Seat Wind", "Prevalent Wind" and "Pung of Terminals or Honours" if applicable)

Four Concealed Pungs 
(Chinese: 四暗刻 sì àn kè)
A hand with four closed triplets or quads.
These points are not counted: "All Pungs", "Three Concealed Pungs", "Two Concealed Pungs" and "Concealed Hand".

Pure Terminal Chows 
(Chinese: 一色双龙会 yī sè shuāng lóng huì)
A hand with two Two Terminal Chows and pair of number 5 in one suit, i.e. 11223355778899 in one suit. This cannot be treated as Seven Pairs hand.
These points are not counted: "Full Flush" and "All Chows".

ex.)

48 points

Quadruple Chow 
(Chinese: 一色四同顺 yī sè sì tóng shùn, 四般高 sì bān gāo)
A hand with four identical sequences.
Point of "Four tiles collection" is not counted.

ex.) with "All Green", "Full Flush", "No Terminals and Honours" and "All Chows"

Four Pure Shifted Pungs 
(Chinese: 一色四节高 yī sè sì jié gāo)
A hand with four number triplets or quads in one suit with successive numbers.
Point of "All triplets" is not counted.

ex.) with "Full Flush", "Reversible tiles", "No Honours" and "Terminal or Non-Special Wind triplet"

32 points

Four Pure Shifted Chows 
(Chinese: 一色四步高 yī sè sì bù gāo)
Four chows of the same continuous number sequence in the same suit, each shifted either one or two number up from the last, but not a combination of both.

ex.1) with "Half Flush"

ex.2) with "Full Flush", "Tile Hogs", "All Chows"

Three Kongs 
(Chinese: 三杠 sān gàng)
A hand with three quad melds (regardless of open or close).
These points are not counted: "Melded Kong", "Concealed Kong", "Two Melded Kong", "Two Concealed Kongs".

ex.) with "Lower Four" and "Mixed Shifted Pungs"
meld:
meld:
meld:
hand:

All Terminals and Honours 
(Chinese: 混幺九 hùn yāo jiǔ)
A hand consisting of only terminal and honor tiles. Can be combined with "Seven Pairs".
These points are not counted: "Pung of Terminals or Honours" and "All Pungs".

ex.) with "Triple Pung", "Dragon Pung" and "All Types"

24 points

Seven Pairs 
(Chinese: 七对子 qī duì zi)
A hand with seven pairs. Four identical tiles can be treated as two pairs. (If so, point of "Tile Hog" is counted.)
These points are not counted: "Concealed Hand" and "Single Wait".

ex.1) with "All Types"

ex.2) with "All Green", "Full Flush", "All Simples", "Reversible Tiles" and three "Tile Hog"

Greater Honours and Knitted Tiles 
(Chinese: 七星不靠 qī xīng bù kào)
Lesser Honours and Knitted Tiles hand containing all 7 honours.
Point of "Lesser Honours and Knitted Tiles" itself is not counted. Other point addition limitation is same as Lesser Honours and Knitted Tiles.

ex.)

All Even Pungs 
(Chinese: 全双刻 quán shuāng kè)
A hand consisting of four even number pungs and an even number pair.
These points are not counted: "All Pungs" and "All Simples".

ex.) with "Reversible Tiles" and "Mixed Double Pung"

Full Flush 
(Chinese: 清一色 qīng yī sè)
A hand consisting of only one suit of number tiles.
Point of "No Honours" is not counted.

ex.) with "Pure Straight", "Pure Double Chow" and "Tile Hog"

Pure Triple Chow 
(Chinese: 一色三同顺 yī sè sān tóng shùn)
A hand with three identical sequences in the same suit.

ex.) with "Lower Tiles", "Outside Hand", "All Chows", "One Voided Suit" and "Mixed Double Chow"

Pure Shifted Pungs 
(Chinese: 一色三节高 yī sè sān jié gāo)
A hand with three number triplets or quads in one suit with successive numbers.

ex.) with "Half Flush" and "Tile Hog"

Upper Tiles 
(Chinese: 全大 quán dà)
A hand consisting of tiles of number 7, 8 and 9.
Point of "Upper Four" is not counted.

ex.) with "Mixed Triple Chow", "Outside Hand", "All Chows" and "Pure Double Chow"

Middle Tiles 
(Chinese: 全中 quán zhōng)
A hand consisting of tiles of number 4, 5 and 6.
Point of "All Simples" is not counted.

ex.) with "All Pungs", "Mixed Shifted Pungs" and "Mixed Double Pung"

Lower Tiles 
(Chinese: 全小 quán xiǎo)
A hand consisting of tiles of number 1, 2 and 3.
Point of "Lower Four" is not counted.

ex.) with "Quadruple Chow", "Outside Hand", "All Chows" and "One Voided Suit"

16 points

Pure Straight 
(Chinese: 清龙 qīng lóng)
A hand with three sequences 123, 456 and 789 in one suit.

ex.) with "All Chows", "One Voided Suit" and "Mixed Double Chow"

Three-Suited Terminal Chows 
(Chinese: 三色双龙会 sān sè shuāng lóng huì)
A hand with two Two Terminal Chows in two suits, and pair of number 5 in the last suit.
Point of "All Chows" is not counted.

ex.)

Pure Shifted Chows 
(Chinese: 一色三步高 yī sè sān bù gāo)
Three Chows in one suit each shifted either one or two numbers up from the last, but not a combination of both.

ex.1) with "All Fives", "All Chows" and "Mixed Double Chow"

ex.2) with "Full Flush", "All Chows" and "Pure Double Chow"

All Fives 
(Chinese: 全带五 quán dài wǔ)
A hand with number 5 tiles be contained in all four set of three tiles and the pair.
Point of "All Simples" is not counted.

ex.) with "Mixed Shifted Chows" and "Tile Hog"

Triple Pung 
(Chinese: 三同刻 sān tóng ke)
A hand with three same number triplets or quads in all three suits.

ex.) with "All Even Pungs", "Middle Tiles"

Three Concealed Pungs 
(Chinese: 三暗刻 sān àn kè)
A hand with three closed triplets or quads.

12 points

Lesser Honours and Knitted Tiles 
(Chinese: 全不靠 quán bù kào)
A hand consisting of fourteen tiles from these 16 tiles: number 1, 4 or 7 of one suit; number 2, 5 or 8 of second suit; number 3, 6 or 9 of third suit; and all honour tiles.
These points are not counted: "All Types", "Concealed Hand", "Single Wait".

ex.1)

ex.2) with "Knitted Straight"

Knitted Straight 
(Chinese: 组合龙 zǔ hé lóng)
A hand with following form of 9 tiles: number 1, 4 or 7 of one suit; number 2, 5 or 8 of another suit; number 3, 6 or 9 of remained suit. These 9 tiles is treated as three sequences(see examples), or as a part of Lesser Honours and Knitted Tiles.

ex.1) with "All Chows"

ex.2) with "All Types" and "Dragon Pung"

Upper Four 
(Chinese: 大于五 dà yú wǔ)
A hand consisting of number tiles of 6, 7, 8 or 9.
Point of "No honour" is not counted.

ex.) with "Mixed Triple Chow", "Pure Double Chow" and "All Chows"

Lower Four 
(Chinese: 小于五 xiǎo yú wǔ)
A hand consisting of number tiles of 1, 2, 3 or 4.
Point of "No honour" is not counted.

ex.) with "Mixed Shifted Pung" and "Tile Hog"

Big Three Winds 
(Chinese: 三风刻 sān fēng kè)
A hand with three winds be triplets or quads.

ex.1) with "All Pungs" (and "Seat Wind" and "Prevalent Wind" if applicable)

8 points

Mixed Straight 
(Chinese: 花龙 huā lóng)
A hand with three sequences 123, 456 and 789 in three suits.

ex.) with "Mixed Double Chow" and "All Chows"

Reversible Tiles 
(Chinese: 推不倒 tuī bù dǎo)
A hand consisting of tiles whose picture is point-symmetric. Available tiles are: .
Point of "One Voided Suit" is not counted.

ex.1) with "Mixed Double Pung", "No Honours" and two "Pung of Terminals or Honours"

ex.2) with "Full Flush" and "Seven Pairs"

Mixed Triple Chow 
(Chinese: 三色三同顺 sān sè sān tóng shùn)
A hand with three same number sequences in all three suits.
Point of "Mixed Double Chow" is not counted.

ex.) with "All Chows" and "Short Straight"

Mixed Shifted Pungs 
(Chinese: 兄弟碰, xiōng dì pèng)   三色三节高 sān sè sān jié gāo)
A hand with three number triplets or quads in three suits with successive numbers.

ex.) with "Upper Tiles", "All Pungs", "Mixed Double Pungs" and "Pung of Terminals or Honours"

Chicken Hand 
(Chinese: 无番和 wú fān hú)
A hand that would otherwise earn 0 points excluding points from Flower Tiles.

ex.)
meld: 
meld: 
hand: 
completion:  or (discarded by another player)
Note. In this case, "Chicken Hand" point is not given if this completion is corresponded to any of Last Tile Claim, Rob Kong or Last Tile.

Last Tile Draw 
(Chinese: 妙手回春 miào shǒu huí chūn)
Hand completion with last tile of the wall.
Point of "Completion by draw" is not counted.

Last Tile Claim 
(Chinese: 海底捞月 hǎi dǐ lāo yuè)
Winning off another player on the last tile (of the game).

Out with Replacement Tile 
(Chinese: 杠上开花 gàng shàng kāi huā)
Hand completion with supplemental tile when melding a quad.
Point of "Completion by draw" is not counted.

Rob Kong 
(Chinese: 抢杠和 qiǎng gàng hú)
Winning off the tile that somebody adds to a melded pung (to create a Kong).
Point of "Last Tile" is not counted.

Two Concealed Kongs
(Chinese: 双暗杠 shuāng àn gàng)
A hand containing two closed quad. 
Point of "Two Concealed Pungs" is not counted.

(Two Concealed Kongs is now worth 8 points.  This is the one change made in 2014, the most recent edit, of the MCR rules. Before this it was worth 6 points. <Mahjong Competition Rules by the World Mahjong Organization 2014>)

6 points

All Pungs 
(Chinese: 碰碰和 pèng pèng hú)
A hand with four triplets or quads.

ex.) with "All Simples", "Mixed Double Pung"

Half Flush 
(Chinese: 混一色 hùn yī sè)
A hand consisting of one suit and honour tiles.

ex.) with "Dragon Pung" and "Two Terminal Chows"

Mixed Shifted Chows 
(Chinese: 三色三步高 sān sè sān bù gāo)
A hand with three sequences in each suit, each shifted up one number from the last.

ex.) with "All Fives" and "Tile Hog"

All Types 
(Chinese: 五门齐 wǔ mén qí)
A hand containing these five types: characters tile, circles tile, bamboos tile, wind tile and dragon tile.

ex.) with "Pung of Terminals or Honours", "Dragon Pung" and "Mixed Double Chow"

Melded Hand 
(Chinese: 全求人 quán qiú rén)
Every set in the hand (chow, pung, kong and pair) must be completed with tiles discarded by other players. All sets must be exposed, and the player goes out on a single wait off another player.
A hand having a "Promoted Kong" (a 4th tile adding onto an existing melded pung) is not valid for "Melded Hand"
Point of "Single Wait" is not counted.

Two Dragon Pungs 
(Chinese: 双箭刻 shuāng jiàn kè)
A hand containing two dragon triplets or quads.
Point of "Dragon Pung" is not counted

4 points

Outside Hand 
(Chinese: 全带幺 quán dài yāo)
A hand that includes terminals and honours in each set, including the pair.

Fully Concealed Hand 
(Chinese: 不求人 bù qiú rén)
A hand without melding (other than "Concealed Kong") and completed by drawing a tile.
Point of "Self-Draw" is not counted.

Two Melded Kongs 
(Chinese: 双明杠 shuāng míng gàng)
A hand with two open quads, or one open and one closed quads.

Last Tile 
(Chinese: 和绝张 hú jué zhāng)
Winning on a tile that is the last of its kind. Three of the other tiles on the table, already revealed to all players (discarded or melded).

2 points

Dragon Pung
(Chinese: 箭刻 jiàn kè)
A hand with a triplet or quad of dragon tile.

Prevalent Wind 
(Chinese: 圈风刻 quān fēng kè)
A hand with a triplet or quad of prevalent wind.

Seat Wind 
(Chinese: 门风刻 mén fēng kè)
A hand with a triplet or quad of seat wind.

Concealed Hand 
(Chinese: 门前清 mén qián qīng)
A hand without melding (other than "Concealed Kong") and completed by discarded tile. If you complete your hand with your draw, point of Fully Concealed Hand is given instead.

All Chows 
(Chinese: 平和 píng hú)
A hand with four sequences and number tile pair. There are point criterion of same name in Japanese mahjong, but criterion itself is different.

Tile Hog 
(Chinese: 四归一 sì guī yī)
A hand with same four tiles, other than melded quad.

Mixed Double Pung 
(Chinese: 双同刻 shuāng tóng kè)
A hand with two same number triplets or quads in two suits.

Two Concealed Pungs 
(Chinese: 双暗刻 shuāng àn kè)
A hand with two closed triplets or quads.

Concealed Kong 
(Chinese: 暗杠 àn gàng)
A hand with a closed quad.

All Simples 
(Chinese: 断幺 duàn yāo)
A hand consisting of no number 1, 9 and honor tile.
Point of "No honours" is not counted.

1 point

Pure Double Chow 
(Chinese: 一般高 yī bān gāo)
Two identical chows in the same suit.

Mixed Double Chow 
(Chinese: 喜相逢 xǐ xiāng féng)
Two chows of the same numbers but in different suits.

Short Straight 
(Chinese: 连六 lián liù)
A hand with two successive sequences in a suit, like 234567.

Two Terminal Chows 
(Chinese: 老少副 lǎo shào fù)
A hand with two sequences 123 and 789 in a suit.

Pung of Terminals or Honours 
(Chinese: 幺九刻 yāo jiǔ kè)
A hand with triplet or quad of number 1, 9 and non-special wind (i.e. neither Seat nor Prevalent Wind) tile.

Melded Kong 
(Chinese: 明杠 míng gàng)
A hand with open quad.

One Voided Suit 
(Chinese: 缺一门 quē yī mén)
A hand that uses tiles from only two of the three suits, lacking any tiles from one of the three suits.

No Honours 
(Chinese: 无字 wú zì)
A hand without any honour tile.

Edge Wait 
(Chinese: 边张 biān zhāng)
A hand completion with the situation there are only one tile name to complete, because you have the incomplete sequence in edge(12 or 89).
Not valid if waiting for more than one tile (for example, holding 1-1-1-2 and winning on 3, as it is also waiting on 2).

Closed Wait 
(Chinese: 坎张 kǎn zhāng)
A hand completion with the situation there are only one tile name to complete, because you have the incomplete sequence lacking center(like 24 and 79).
Not valid if waiting for more than one tile (for example, holding 2-2-2-4 and winning on 3, as it is also waiting on 4).

Single Wait 
(Chinese: 单钓将 dān diào jiāng)
A hand completion solely waiting on a tile to form a pair.
Not valid if waiting for more than one tile (for example, holding 2-3-3-3 and winning on 2, as it is also waiting on 1 and 4).

Self-Draw 
(Chinese: 自摸 zì mō)
A hand completion by draw.

Flower Tile 
(Chinese: 花牌 huā pái)
Whenever a player has or draws a Flower Tile, declare "花 huā" (meaning "Flower" in Chinese) and get a supplemental tile. This is counted as 1 point. 
In case of "Hu" on a Flower replacement, the point for "Self-Draw" can be added, but not the points for Out with Replacement Tile. 
Flower Tiles may be discarded (without taking a replacement).
Flower Tile points cannot be counted for winning criteria of 8 points.

References

Notes 

Mahjong